Major (Ret.) Owen Hunt, M.D., F.A.C.S. is a fictional character from the medical drama television series Grey's Anatomy, which airs on the American Broadcasting Company (ABC) in the United States. The character was created by series' producer Shonda Rhimes, and is portrayed by Scottish actor Kevin McKidd. He was introduced in season five as a U.S. Army trauma surgeon who served in war-torn Iraq, and subsequently joins the fictional Seattle Grace Hospital to teach medicine as a surgical attending, head of trauma surgery, and eventual chief of surgery, sometimes with unorthodox methods. Originally contracted to appear for a multi-episode story arc, he was upgraded to a series' regular at the conclusion of his first appearance.

The fictional character served as a love interest for surgical fellow Cristina Yang, and had an unstable personality when first introduced, suffering from posttraumatic stress disorder (PTSD). McKidd's connection with fellow actress Sandra Oh (Cristina Yang) has been acclaimed amongst critics, with Matt Roush of TV Guide calling the "instant sparks" between McKidd and Oh "electrifying." McKidd was nominated for two awards for his work on the show, winning one of them. Chris Monfette of IGN has praised the addition of "fresh, new characters" such as Owen Hunt.

Storylines 

Before his regular appearances on the show, Owen Hunt was a United States Army surgeon, specializing in trauma surgery. He held the rank of Major. The character makes a dramatic first appearance when he performs a tracheotomy on a man with a pen, winning the admiration of resident Cristina Yang (Sandra Oh). He is offered a job by former chief of surgery Richard Webber (James Pickens, Jr.), but declines, explaining that he has not completed his tour in Iraq. His appointment as the new head of trauma surgery at Seattle Grace Hospital was not well-received initially. By his first week he manages to irk both Derek Shepherd (Patrick Dempsey) and Mark Sloan (Eric Dane), head of neurosurgery and plastic surgery, respectively, who view his treatment of some of the patients as crude, and also rebuffed by resident Izzie Stevens (Katherine Heigl) when he stabs a set of pigs and then orders the residents and interns to save their lives, in order to teach them medicine on "live tissue." Hunt eventually embarks on a relationship with Yang, but it comes to a sudden close when his PTSD gets the best of him, and he unconsciously strangles her. Soon after the breakup, he begins therapy with the hospital psychiatrist, Dr. Wyatt. Some time later, a soldier visits the hospital for treatment, and his presence influences Owen to contemplate returning to the US Army. When he shares this with Cristina, she disagrees with his decision, stating that she doesn't want him to die, and the two eventually rekindle their relationship. Owen brings in Teddy Altman (Kim Raver), his best friend and colleague from when he was in the army, as the new head of cardiothoracic surgery. When it is revealed that Hunt and Altman may be potential lovers, Hunt and Yang's relationship is challenged, and eventually concluded by Yang.

During a hospital shooting, Owen is shot and injured, attracting the sympathy of Cristina, who subsequently restores their relationship. Due to the emotional reverberations of the shooting crisis, Owen and Cristina decide to wed one another shortly after their reconciliation, not wanting to risk separation. There are some concerns from Cristina's friends that Owen is taking advantage of her PTSD to rush her into marriage, which she had previously decided against. When Cristina discovers she is pregnant, Owen is displeased with her desire to abort the baby, and the two separate from each other. One of the major, recurring points of conflict in their relationship are Owen's strong desires for children and a traditional wife, and Cristina's equally strong conviction that she never wants children. In the fallout of resident Meredith Grey (Ellen Pompeo)'s tampering with Derek Shepherd's Alzheimer's trial, Owen is promoted to Chief of Surgery after Webber steps down. After substantial thought, Owen reluctantly decides to accompany Cristina to the abortion, uniting the two. Owen's friendship with Teddy ends when Owen lies to Teddy about her husband's sudden death, due to Owen wanting her to finish a surgery she was currently performing and Teddy blaming Owen for her husband's death. Feeling abandoned and disconcerted after an altercation with Cristina, Owen has a one-night stand with a patient's friend. Cristina consequently finds out, terminates their relationship, and their marriage is tested. After Cristina passed her medical boards, she reconciles with Owen, but reveals to him that she is leaving Seattle to go to Mayo Clinic. Teddy and Owen eventually became friends again. She had been offered a position at the United States Army Medical Command but chose to stay at Seattle Grace Mercy West out of loyalty. After Teddy's husband Henry dies she wallows in her grief and it affects her colleagues and residents, causing Owen to "fire" her so that she can have a fresh start elsewhere. He also fires April Kepner (Sarah Drew) because the hospital cannot afford to keep her due to her not being a Board certified. Months later, Hunt visits Kepner and rehires her as he realized he made a mistake. In later seasons, Owen and Kepner become close friends due to her choice to sign up with the military, a decision Owen helped prompt and encourage, and a decision which leads to the eventual end of Kepner's marriage to Avery.

In season 9 Cristina and Owen's marriage is again very strained. Cristina is working at Mayo Clinic and Owen in Seattle but she returns. Owen asks for a divorce. He later shows that he is still in love with her and only asked for a divorce so Cristina and the others involved in the plane crash get the money. Cristina and Owen reconcile in episode 9 before Bailey's wedding.

In season 10, Cristina decides to accept a job to run a state of the art clinic in Switzerland. Owen supports her decision as he realizes no good could come from him asking her to stay, but requests her not to leave him until she has to leave him for good, following which, they both spend two weeks leading to her permanent departure together. While saying her farewell to her colleagues of the last seven years, there is a possible act of terrorism in Seattle, which later turns out to be just a gas main explosion. Cristina has a quick but emotional goodbye hug with Derek, Bailey, and Webber, leaves her shares of the hospital to Alex, and dances it out with Meredith one last time to an old favorite song. Owen, however, is busy saving a patient in the O.R., so they share a silent goodbye through the gallery's glass.

In Season 11, Owen develops a relationship with Amelia Shepherd. This is off and on throughout Season 11 and 12 until the end of Season 12 where he and Amelia get married, after Amelia proposes to him. Owen is attracted to Amelia's desire for a "real family" and children. In Season 14, after going through a series of marital issues, Owen decides to pursue a divorce from Amelia, citing Amelia's reversal on wanting to have children and her increasingly erratic behavior. Owen listens to Amelia when she, in a fit of pique, tells him to go be with Teddy. As a result, he flies to Germany to be with Teddy, but, after they spend the night together, Owen reveals he is there at his wife's suggestion. Teddy is insulted he made her a last choice, citing his inability to be alone, and Teddy breaks it off. Owen returns to Grey Sloan alone.

It is later discovered that Amelia's behavior was caused by a brain tumor. In a reversal of blame, Amelia is angry that Owen placed sole blame on her for their marital issues, as well as committing adultery with Teddy, since he ignored all of her tumor symptoms as selfishness and poor character. Despite pursuing their divorce, they continue sleeping together. Owen decides to pursue his lifelong dream of fatherhood alone and begins fostering Leo, a baby who was given up by his teenage mother. When Amelia finds Leo's mother, Betty, homeless and addicted to drugs, Amelia takes Betty in, and, together, Owen and Amelia take care of Leo and Betty at Owen's home, reconciling and deciding to stay in their relationship and renew their marriage.

In Season 15, Owen and Amelia have a strong relationship, which is interrupted by the news that Teddy is pregnant with Owen's child. Teddy did not tell Owen at first, because she knew he would leave Amelia for the chance to be a father, and Teddy does not want to be with Owen after he made her his alternate choice. Owen is upset because he would not have reconciled with Amelia or fostered Leo if Teddy had told him earlier that he was expecting a biological child. This causes additional tension with Amelia, who knows Owen would have left her without trying to salvage their marriage. In light of Teddy's disinterest, Owen tells Amelia he chooses her. 
However, Owen continues to exhibit possessive and obsessive behavior over Teddy and her pregnancy, causing Amelia to permanently split from their relationship. Owen then adopts Leo as his son and welcomes his newborn daughter, Allison, with Teddy, whom they named after Teddy's best friend Allison Brown, who died during the collapse of the second tower on September 11, 2001. Teddy has a change of mind and decides to try a relationship with Owen.

In Season 16, Owen is in a relationship with Teddy, whom he had previously given his position as Grey-Sloan's Head of Trauma to keep her in the country. Owen has a contentious relationship with the new Chief of Surgery, Koracik, whom Teddy had dated during her pregnancy. After Owen accidentally electrocutes his genitals, Koracik takes out a restraining order against Owen, requiring him to be 500 feet away. Teddy has been finding motherhood overwhelming and hating her maternity leave, so Owen decides to take paternity leave to allow her to return to work. His paternity leave turns into a resignation. Owen eventually accepts an offer from Karev to become Chief of Trauma at Pac-North after he finds stay-at-home parenting overwhelming and boring, though when Pac-North merges with Grey Sloan, Owen returns to Grey Sloan. At the end of the season, Owen discovers that Teddy is cheating on him with Koracick after Teddy accidentally sends Owen a voicemail of her and Koracick having sex.

In Season 17, Owen confronts Teddy about her affair and ends their engagement. He and Teddy butt heads at work, as Owen is unable to forgive Teddy, but he eventually offers her friendship after she falls in a catatonic state from overworking herself in the COVID-19 pandemic frontlines. Owen and Teddy start sleeping with each other again, and in the season finale, Owen proposes to Teddy, which she accepts.

In the beginning of Season 18, Owen and Teddy got married at the Emerald City Bar after their wedding at the Park was interrupted by a bicycle accident.

Development

Casting and creation 

Shonda Rhimes, series' creator, says that the character was envisioned "an old-fashioned tortured hero" and likens him to Heathcliff. Originally set to appear in a multi-episode story arc, Kevin McKidd's contract was extended, securing him a slot as a series' regular of Grey's Anatomy. In July 2008, Entertainment Weekly announced the possibility of McKidd becoming a series' regular, with this possibility eventually being confirmed by People. When asked of how he got involved with the show, McKidd offered the insight:  McKidd told BuddyTV, "It's been really great. I was nervous when I started because every job I've ever done before this, I have been in the job right from day one when everybody's new and getting to know each other. So I was nervous because I had never done this before. And I feel really grateful to the Grey's cast and crew and everyone there, really, because they've been so nice to me and gracious and accepting of me joining the show. The transition was much easier than I thought it might be, which I'm very grateful for." McKidd has told People that he thinks Grey's Anatomy is a great show and he feels lucky to be on it. Shonda Rhimes, the series' creator, said of his addition, "I am excited to have Kevin McKidd joining us for the season, he's been a delight to collaborate with and brings incredible passion, talent and creativity to his work. Plus, he’s already got the ‘Mc’ built into his name so we had to keep him."

Characterization

The American Broadcasting Company (ABC) characterized Hunt as "confident", "innovative", "intelligent", while he also can be "aggressive", "brazen", "presumptuous", "hasty and rash". McKidd said of his character: "[...] He's not an easy character to connect to, I think. There's some darkness to him and there's some danger to him that I think is really interesting and exciting to play. [...]" Additionally, McKidd describes Hunt as "very instinctive, and follows his gut, and he's very impulsive, and very immediate. He immediately assesses a situation. And he's very honest, sometimes painfully honest, with himself and with others. He wants to make himself better. He wants to improve himself as a person. He's a decent guy, a sort of a guy I'd like to go out and have a beer with." Hunt's unorthodox teaching methods have been the subject of controversy. McKidd said of this:  The look of Owen has been described as hardcore and the antithesis of the other males on the show. McKidd says it's not just the look of Owen, but the fact that in his profession, he is dealing with life and death every day. The one distinction he finds between his character and the others is that Owen does not care what other people think of him. When McKidd returned from his first appearance, his character appeared to have been changed. McKidd told TV Guide: "Yes, that was who he really is in the premiere, but now we're seeing what can happen to a good man, a good soldier and good surgeon [because of war]."

The character of Owen Hunt had an almost instant attraction to Cristina Yang since his first appearance at Seattle Grace, illustrated by the passionate kiss they share soon after they meet. Owen's story and connection with fellow character Cristina has been a topic of discussion. McKidd said: "Between him [Owen] and her [Cristina], it’s going to get really complex and kind of tense and explosive." Owen and Cristina have experienced roadblocks in their fictional relationship, and continue to. McKidd offered this insight on his character's relationship with Cristina: 

McKidd has referred to his character and the character of Cristina Yang as "soulmates." Speaking of Owen's PTSD storyline, McKidd stated: "What's exciting about telling this story with this character is that it's quite brave of ABC and Shonda [Rhimes], on a prime-time network TV show, to address a tough subject, and one that people don't necessarily want to hear about.  But so far the writing room is handling it beautifully. They're not banging people over the head with it but exploring it in a sensitive and interesting way." Owen and Cristina have struggled with their fictional relationship in season eight, leading to Owen having a sexual affair. Directly before the episode involving the affair aired, McKidd said to Entertainment Weekly: "The thing about Owen is that he tries to do things perfectly, and obviously, he messes up as the chief because you have to make these odd black-and-white decisions and sometimes you make the wrong decision. There’s a lot of stress in his life at the moment, so he’s trying not to let that affect his efficiency as chief." Although the characters' marriage is tested, McKidd reported to The Hollywood Reporter: "I think they're meant for each other. I hold out faith in Cristina and Owen, even though they go to the darkest places out of all the couples on the show. It's going to get worse but it's going to get better soon."

Reception

The character has received generally positive feedback from television critics. Weeks after Hunt's first appearance on the show, Matt Roush of TV Guide commented that "Hunt/McKidd is the most encouraging thing to happen to Grey's Anatomy in quite a while." He also added: "The instant sparks between him [Hunt] and Yang were electrifying." On the other hand, Robert Rorke of the New York Post states that McKidd was brought in as Hunt to "boost the sagging fortunes" of the show's ratings. Kelley L. Carter of USA Today, describes Hunt as "hardcore" and "the antithesis of the other males on the show." Chris Monfette of IGN said that the fifth season of Grey's Anatomy was an improvement on the previous two seasons, attributing this in part to the introduction of "fresh, new characters", Owen and Arizona Robbins (Jessica Capshaw). He also referred to McKidd as "the season [five]'s best, most effective addition", adding:  Margaret Lyons of New York Magazine judged Hunt "too sad" for the first part of the ninth season. In 2010, Kevin McKidd was nominated for the Prism Award for Best Performance in a Drama Series' Multi-Episode Storyline, and won the award. In 2011, McKidd was nominated for the Prism Award for Best Performance in a Drama Series, for his work on Grey's Anatomy. McKidd was nominated, along with the rest of the Grey's Anatomy cast, for Best Drama Series at the 21st GLAAD Media Awards, in 2010. Also in 2010, McKidd, and the rest of the cast, were nominated for Outstanding Drama Series, at the NAACP Image Awards. The same nomination was received at the 2011 NAACP Image Awards, with the cast winning the award. At the 43rd NAACP Image Awards, in 2012, McKidd and the cast were nominated yet again for Outstanding Drama Series.

References
Specific

General

External links 
 Owen Hunt at ABC.com

Grey's Anatomy characters
Fictional surgeons
Fictional majors
Television characters introduced in 2008
Fictional United States Army personnel
Fictional characters with post-traumatic stress disorder
Fictional Iraq War veterans
Male characters in television